

Beecham's Pills were a laxative first marketed about 1842 in Wigan, Lancashire. They were invented by Thomas Beecham (1820–1907), grandfather of the conductor Sir Thomas Beecham (1879–1961).

Commercial history

The pills themselves were a combination of aloe, ginger, and soap. They were initially advertised like other patent medicine as a cure-all, but they actually did benefit the digestive process. This effectiveness made them stand out from other remedies for sale in the mid-19th century.

The pills, and their marketing, were the basis for Beecham's Patent Pills, which became Beecham Estates and Pills in 1924, eight years after the death of Sir Joseph Beecham, the son of Thomas Beecham. The pills continued to be made by a succession of companies: Beecham Pills Limited, Beecham Pharmaceuticals Limited, Beecham Health Care, and SmithKline Beecham. The manufacture of the pills was discontinued in 1998.

Popularity
The popularity of the pills produced a wide range of testimonials that were used in advertising. The poet William Topaz McGonagall wrote a poem advertising the pills, giving his recommendation in verse. Two slogans used in Beecham's advertising were "Worth a guinea a box", and "Beecham's pills make all the difference".

The Cockney rhyming slang Beecham for a still (photograph) comes from Beecham's pills (Beecham Pill, pill rhymes with still).

See also
 Beecham (pharmaceutical company)
 Pharmaceutical industry in the United Kingdom

Notes

References
"'Best for Me, Best For You'—A History of Beecham's Pills 1842–1998", The Pharmaceutical Journal. vol. 269, pp. 921–924.
Anne Francis, "A Guinea a Box: A Biography", London, Hale (1968)

External links
 History of GlaxoSmithKline – successor to Beecham's Patent Pills.
 Box For Beecham's Pills via Science Museum

1842 introductions
GSK plc brands
Laxatives
Patent medicines